Cobana is a genus of herbaceous, perennial and bulbous plants in the family Iridaceae. A monotypic genus, it contains a single species, Cobana guatemalensis, distributed in Honduras and Guatemala.

References

Bibliography
Ravenna P. 1974. Cobana: a new genus of Central American Iridaceae. Bot. Notiser 127. (1): 104–108.

Iridaceae
Monotypic Iridaceae genera
Flora of Guatemala
Flora of Honduras